

Sandyford Cricket Club, Marlay Park, Dublin

History of Sandyford CC 

Sandyford Cricket Club was founded in 1984   in the Dublin suburb of Sandyford. The club's home ground is located in Marlay Park, a 300-acre public park, about nine kilometers from Dublin city center. The club is a member of the Leinster Cricket Union  and currently fields three adult teams across various divisions.

 The first team is in division 6  
 The second team is in division 12  
 The third team is in division 19

Fixtures and results

Location crisis 2022 
The current location of Sandyford CC in Marlay Park is also the location where the Longitude Festival is held each year. After the 3 concerts and 3 days of Longitude Festival in 2022, the outfield was left in ruins and in a state that was unfit to play cricket. This gained significant social media traction. 

As of September 2022, Sandyford Cricket Club and the Dún Laoghaire–Rathdown County Council are working to move the cricket ground to a new location in keeping with the Marlay Park Master Plan.

Club Honors 

 1st team league titles (7): 1985 (Junior B), 1990 (Junior A), 1995 (Intermediate B), 1996 (Intermediate A), 2002 (Middle A), 2016 (Division 7), 2022 (Division 6).
 2nd team league titles (5): 1989 (Junior B), 1994 (Junior B), 2006 (Junior A), 2008 (Intermediate B), 2021 (Division 13).
 3rd team league titles (1): 2008 (Junior B).

Cup Final Victories 

 2008 Middle 2 Cup Final: Sandyford I beat Knockharley
 2008 Whelan Cup Final: Sandyford II beat Rush
 2022 YMCA Salver Final: Sandyford I beat Balbriggan 2 
 2022 Adamstown Cup Final: Sandyford III beat Kilkenny 3

References

External links 
 Sandyford Cricket Club, Marlay Park
 Sandyford Cricket Club archived website
 Sandyford Cricket Club listing on the Cricket Leinster website

Cricket clubs established in 1984
Cricket clubs in County Dublin
1984 establishments in Ireland
Sandyford
Sports clubs in Dún Laoghaire–Rathdown